Kidbrooke railway station serves Kidbrooke in the Royal Borough of Greenwich, south-east London.

The station and all trains serving it are operated by Southeastern.

Location 
The station is on the Bexleyheath line, and opened when the line began operating on 1 May 1895. The original station buildings here remained in place until 1972, when they were replaced with a CLASP prefabricated structure, and this in turn was replaced in 1994 by a brown-brick construction with a tiled pitched roof. A new interim station building was opened in 2014 as part of a phased development here, linked to the total rebuild of the Ferrier Estate (now called Kidbrooke Village). A brand new station building was opened on 3 April 2021.

To the west of the station is the short Kidbrooke Tunnel. A goods yard at the station was closed, along with those at Eltham Well Hall and Bexleyheath stations, on 7 October 1968.

Services 

The typical off-peak service in trains per hour is:
 2 tph to 
 2 tph to London Cannon Street
 2 tph to 

During the peak hours, the station is served by an additional half-hourly service between Dartford and London Charing Cross.

Connections
London Buses routes 178, 335 and B16 serve the station.

References

External links 

Railway stations in the Royal Borough of Greenwich
Former South Eastern Railway (UK) stations
Railway stations in Great Britain opened in 1895
Railway stations served by Southeastern
1895 establishments in England